Phloeonomus laesicollis is a species of ocellate rove beetle in the family Staphylinidae.

References

Further reading

External links

 
 

Omaliinae
Beetles described in 1852